This article lists important figures and events in Malaysian public affairs during the year 1999, together with births and deaths of notable Malaysians.

Incumbent political figures

Federal level
Yang di-Pertuan Agong:
Tuanku Jaafar (until 25 April)
Sultan Salahuddin Abdul Aziz Shah (from 26 April)
Raja Permaisuri Agong:
Tuanku Najihah (until 25 April)
Tuanku Siti Aishah (from 26 April)
Prime Minister: Dato' Sri Dr Mahathir Mohamad
Deputy Prime Minister:
Dato' Sri Anwar Ibrahim (until February)
Dato' Sri Abdullah Ahmad Badawi (from February)
Chief Justice: Eusoff Chin

State level
 Sultan of Johor: Sultan Iskandar
 Sultan of Kedah: Sultan Abdul Halim Muadzam Shah
 Sultan of Kelantan: Sultan Ismail Petra
 Raja of Perlis: Tuanku Syed Putra
 Sultan of Perak: Sultan Azlan Shah
 Sultan of Pahang: Sultan Ahmad Shah
 Sultan of Selangor: Tengku Idris Shah (Regent from 26 April)
 Sultan of Terengganu: Sultan Mizan Zainal Abidin (Deputy Yang di-Pertuan Agong)
 Yang di-Pertuan Besar of Negeri Sembilan: Tunku Naquiyuddin (Regent until 25 April)
 Yang di-Pertua Negeri (Governor) of Penang: Tun Dr Hamdan Sheikh Tahir
 Yang di-Pertua Negeri (Governor) of Malacca: Tun Syed Ahmad Al-Haj bin Syed Mahmud Shahabuddin
 Yang di-Pertua Negeri (Governor) of Sarawak: Tun Ahmad Zaidi Adruce Mohammed Noor
 Yang di-Pertua Negeri (Governor) of Sabah: Tun Sakaran Dandai

Events
1 January – Visit Negeri Sembilan Year 1999 officially began
January – Malaysia exited from economic crisis
15 January – Tan Sri Abdul Rahim Noor resigned as the Inspector General of Police after taking full responsibility for injuries suffered by former Deputy Prime Minister, Anwar Ibrahim while in police custody.
February – Abdullah Ahmad Badawi became Deputy Prime Minister, replacing Dato' Seri Anwar Ibrahim.
3 March – Many federal administration sections were moved to the new federal administrative centre in Putrajaya, but Kuala Lumpur remained the capital.
4 March – Sultan Mizan Zainal Abidin was crowned as Sultan of Terengganu.
10 March – Baby dugong, Si Tenang was found dead by a fisherman in Pasir Gudang, Johor.
15 March – The Smart TAG on-board unit (OBU) was launched, replacing PLUS TAG
4 April – Parti Keadilan Nasional (Keadilan) was launched.
14 April – Dato' Seri Anwar Ibrahim was found guilty of corruption and sentenced to six years in jail.
16-18 April – 1999 Malaysian motorcycle Grand Prix
19 April – Two brothers, Justin Read, 19 and Gerald Read, 25 were the first Malaysians to reach the North Pole after encountering challenging weather.
20 April – The Sepang International Circuit, Malaysia's home of motorsports was officially opened.
26 April – Sultan Salahuddin Abdul Aziz Shah of Selangor was elected as the 11th Yang di-Pertuan Agong.
May – Menara Alor Star, Alor Star first landmarks officially opened.
15 May – A landslide near Bukit Antarabangsa, Ulu Klang, Selangor. Most of the Bukit Antarabangsa civilians were trapped.
21 May – Sun Cruises' liner SS Galileo Galilei or also known as SS Sun Vista sank in the Straits of Malacca near Penang after the vessel suffered an engine room fire, which cut all power. All 1,090 passengers and crew were safely evacuated.
21 June – Prime Minister, Mahathir Mohamad moved into new office at the Perdana Putra building in the new federal administrative centre in Putrajaya.
8 July – The official opening ceremony for the Multimedia Super Corridor (MSC) centre in Cyberjaya.
10 August – Azhar Mansor becomes the first Malaysian solo sailor to sail around the world by Jalur Gemilang sailing ship.
23 August – The establishment of University of Selangor in Selangor.
26 August – The Institut Teknologi MARA (ITM) was given its university status and renamed Universiti Teknologi MARA (UiTM).
31 August – The Petronas Twin Towers was officially opening ceremony by Prime Minister of Malaysia Tun Dr. Mahathir bin Mohamad in conjunction with Petronas celebrated its twenty-fifth year of anniversary with silver jubilee the,e and Independence Day celebrated its forty-second year of anniversary.
September – Opening of the Istana Budaya in Kuala Lumpur.
September – The Bintang Walk at Bukit Bintang was officially opened.
11 September – Sultan Salahuddin Abdul Aziz Shah of Selangor was installed as Yang di-Pertuan Agong.
1 October – Bank of Commerce merged with Bank Bumiputra Malaysia Berhad and changed its name to Bumiputra-Commerce Bank Berhad.
10 October – Opening of the Port of Tanjung Pelepas in Johor.
17 October – The first Formula One Petronas Malaysian Grand Prix held at the Sepang International Circuit.
25 October – Barisan Nasional celebrated its 25th anniversary.
18 November – Mid Valley Megamall, the largest shopping complex in Malaysia was officially opened.
 18–21 November - World Cup Golf Malaysia 1999
29 November – The 1999 General Elections. Terengganu fall to the PAS party.
22 December – A Mutiara express bus caught fire after plunging into a ravine at Kampung Bayu in Paloh, near Gua Musang, Kelantan killing three passengers and injuring eight.

Births
 18 March - Muhammad Saiful Aiman Shaharudin – Badminton player
 12 July – Nur Dhabitah Sabri – Diver
 11 September – Nurin Jazlin – Murder victim (died 2007)
 24 November - Muhammad Erry Hidayat – Weightlifter

Deaths
2 February – Tunku Kurshiah binti Almarhum Tunku Besar Burhanuddin — Tunku Ampuan Besar Negeri Sembilan and first Raja Permaisuri Agong

See also
 1999
 1998 in Malaysia | 2000 in Malaysia
 History of Malaysia

References 

 
Malaysia
Years of the 20th century in Malaysia
1990s in Malaysia
Malaysia